Chan Hao-ching and Anabel Medina Garrigues were the defending champions, but Chan chose not to participate this year and Medina Garrigues chose to compete in Strasbourg instead.
Kiki Bertens and Johanna Larsson won the title, defeating Shuko Aoyama and Renata Voráčová in the final, 6–3, 6–4.

Seeds

Draw

References
 Main Draw

Nurnberger Versicherungscupandnbsp;- Doubles
2016 Doubles
2016 in German tennis